The Indian state of Kerala borders Arabian sea coastline on the west, Tamil Nadu on the south and east, Karnataka on the north and north east. Western Ghats form an almost continuous mountain wall, except near Palakkad where there is a natural mountain pass known as the Palakkad Gap.

When the independent India amalgamated smaller states together Travancore and Cochin states were integrated to form Travancore-Cochin state on 1 July 1949. However, North Malabar and South Malabar remained under the Madras state. The States Reorganisation Act of 1 November 1956 elevated Kerala to statehood, through the unification of Malayalam-speaking territories in the southwestern Malabar Coast of India.

The state of Kerala is divided into 14 revenue districts. On the basis of geographical, historical and cultural similarities the state's districts are generally grouped into three parts – The Northern Kerala districts of Kasaragod, Kannur, Wayanad, Kozhikode; the Central Kerala districts of Malappuram, Palakkad, Thrissur, Ernakulam; and the Southern Kerala districts of Idukki, Kottayam, Alappuzha, Pathanamthitta, Kollam, and Thiruvananthapuram. Such a regional division occurred being part of historical regions of Cochin, North Malabar, South Malabar, and Travancore. The North Malabar region, which is culturally distinct from the rest of Kerala, entirely lies in the districts of Northern Kerala. The regions of South Malabar and Kingdom of Cochin, both of which share a lot of historical, geographical, and cultural similarities, together constitute the districts of Central Kerala. The Travancore region is incorporated in the districts of South Kerala. The Travancore region was again divided into three zones as Northern Travancore (Hill Range) (Idukki and a smaller portion of Ernakulam), Central Travancore (Central Range) (Pathanamthitta, Alappuzha and Kottayam) and Southern Travancore (Southern Range) (Thiruvananthapuram and Kollam). 

The districts in Kerala are often named after the largest town or city in the district. The 14 districts are further divided into 77 taluks, 6 Municipal Corporations, 87 Municipalities, and 941 Gram panchayats. Some of the districts were renamed in 1990 from the anglicised names to their local names.

Administrative structure

Kerala State has been divided into 14 districts, 78 taluks, 152 community development blocks, 941 Gram panchayats, 6 corporations and 87 municipalities.

A district is governed by a District Collector, who is an officer from Indian Administrative Service (IAS) of Kerala cadre and is appointed by the State Government of Kerala. Functionally the district administration is carried on through the various Departments of the State Government each of which has an office of its own the district level. The District Collector is the executive leader of the district administration and the District Officers of the various Departments in the district render technical advice to him in the discharge of his duties. The District Collector is a key functionary of Government having large powers and responsibilities. He has a dual role to both as the agent of the Government of the state and also as the representative of the people in the district. He is also responsible for the maintenance of the law and order of the district.

Other than urban units such as town municipalities and rural units called Gram panchayats, other government administrative subdivisions includes taluks and 'community development blocks' (also known as CD blocks or blocks). A taluk consists of urban units such as census towns and rural units called gram panchayats. The Tahsildar in charge of each taluk is primarily the Revenue Official responsible for the collection of revenue of the taluk, but he is also expected to be in direct contact with the people at all levels and to have first hand knowledge of the conditions of every village under his jurisdiction. The Tahsildar is assisted in each village by village officers and village assistants. A block also consists of such as census towns and Gram panchayats. A block is administered by a Block Development Officer (BDO), who is appointed by the Government of Kerala. A gram panchayat, which consists of a group of villages, is administered by a village council headed by a Gram Panchayat President. A municipality, which consists of urban areas, is administered by a municipal council headed by a Municipal Chairperson.

A District Police Chief, better known as a Superintendent of Police, heads the District Police organization of Kerala Police. This is as per the Police Act of 1861, which is applicable to the whole of India. The Superintendents of Police are officers of the Indian Police Service. For every subdivision, there is a Subdivision Police, headed by a Police officer of the rank of Assistant Superintendent of Police or Deputy Superintendent of Police. Under subdivisions, there are Police Stations, each headed by a Station House Officer of the rank of Inspector of Police, or in case of rural areas, by a Sub-Inspector of Police.

The Kerala High Court has the jurisdiction of the state of Kerala. Each of the districts has a District & Sessions Court.

{
  "type": "ExternalData",
  "service": "geoshape",
  "query": "SELECT ?id ?idLabel (concat('', ?idLabel, '') as ?title) \n WHERE {?id wdt:P31 wd:Q1149652 . # is a \n?id wdt:P131 wd:Q1186 . # in India \nSERVICE wikibase:label { bd:serviceParam wikibase:language 'en' } \n}\n"}

History
At the time of formation, Kerala had only five districts: Malabar, Thrissur, Kottayam, Kollam, and Thiruvananthapuram.

On 1 January 1957, the Malabar district was trifurcated to form new districts of Kannur, Kozhikode, and Palakkad, bringing the total to seven districts.

Alappuzha district was carved out of erstwhile Kottayam and Kollam districts on 17 August 1957, to form the 8th district.

Ernakulam district was formed on 1 April 1958 as the 9th district, carved out of parts of erstwhile Thrissur and Kottayam districts.

Malappuram district was formed on 16 June 1969 as the 10th district, with Ernad and Tirur taluks of the erstwhile Kozhikode district and Perinthalmanna and Ponnani taluks of Palakkad district.

Idukki district was formed on 26 January 1972 as the 11th district, with Devikulam, Udumbanchola and Peermedu taluks of the erstwhile Kottayam district and Thodupuzha taluk of the erstwhile Ernakulam district.

Wayanad district was formed on 1 November 1980 as the 12th district in Kerala by carving out areas from Kozhikode and Kannur districts.

Pathanamthitta district was formed on 1 November 1982 as the 13th district by carving out the entire Pathanamthitta taluk and nine villages of Kunnathur taluk from Kollam district, entire Thiruvalla taluk and part of Chengannur and Mavelikkara taluks from Alapphuzha district and parts of Idukki district.

Kasaragod district was formed on 24 May 1984 as the 14th district by carving out a major portion of the erstwhile Kannur district.

Alphabetical listing

See also
 Kerala state
 Government of Kerala
 Corporations, Municipalities and Taluks of Kerala
 List of districts of India
 Revenue Divisions of Kerala

References

Further reading

External links

 Official website of Government of Kerala

 
Kerala
Kerala geography-related lists